Maharashtra 1 is a Marathi 24×7 News Television News Channel, owned by the Sadhana Group. It was launched in January 2016.

Marathi-language television channels
Television channels and stations established in 2016
Television stations in Mumbai
Television stations in India
2016 establishments in Maharashtra